A calcifuge is a plant that does not tolerate alkaline (basic) soil.  The word is derived from the Latin 'to flee from chalk'. These plants are also described as ericaceous, as the prototypical calcifuge is the genus Erica (heaths). It is not the presence of carbonate or hydroxide ions per se that these plants cannot tolerate, but the fact that under alkaline conditions, iron becomes less soluble. Consequently, calcifuges grown on alkaline soils often develop the symptoms of iron deficiency, i.e. interveinal chlorosis of new growth. There are many horticultural plants which are calcifuges, most of which require an 'ericaceous' compost with a low pH, composed principally of Sphagnum moss peat.

A plant that thrives in lime-rich soils is known as a calcicole.

Examples

Order Ericales

Ericaceae
Andromeda polifolia
Calluna (common heather)
Cassiope lycopodioides
Daboecia
Enkianthus campanulatus
Erica (but not E. carnea or E. erigena)
Gaultheria mucronata
Kalmia latifolia (calico bush)
Pieris
 Rhododendron (many species of rhododendron and azalea)
Vaccinium corymbosum (northern highbush blueberry)
Vaccinium myrtillus (bilberry)

Sarraceniaceae (carnivorous)
Pitcher plants of the genera Sarracenia, Darlingtonia, and Heliamphora

Styracaceae
Styrax wilsonii

Theaceae
Camellia sinensis (Tea plant)

Order Caryophyllales

Droseraceae (carnivorous)
Drosera (sundew species; but some species are calcitolerant or calciphilous)
Dionaea muscipula (Venus flytrap)

Nepenthaceae (carnivorous)
Nepenthes (pitcher plants; but some species are calcitolerant or even calciphilous)

Order Lamiales

Lentibulariaceae (carnivorous)
Utricularia sect. Calpidisca and some other subgenera (non-epiphytic terrestrial bladderworts; there are some species that prefer neutral pH or are calciphilous)

Other orders

Asteraceae
 Arnica montana

Columelliaceae
Desfontainia spinosa

Cornaceae
Cornus florida (dogwood)

Elaeocarpaceae
Crinodendron hookerianum

Fagaceae
Quercus (Some species of oak)

Gentianaceae
Gentiana acaulis
Gentiana sino-ornata

Hamamelidaceae
Corylopsis pauciflora
Disanthus cercidifolius
Fothergilla major
Hamamelis vernalis (spring witch hazel)

Papaveraceae
Meconopsis grandis (Himalayan blue poppy)

Poaceae
Avena sativa (oat)

Proteaceae
Embothrium coccineum
Grevillea rosmarinifolia

Schisandraceae
Illicium anisatum

References

External links
Tyler, G. 1996. Mineral nutrient limitations of calcifuge plants in phosphate sufficient limestone soil. Annals of Botany. 77 (6) 649-656.

Plant physiology